This is an appendix to the article Territorial formation of France. It is concerned with the detail of the minor treaties dealing with the borders between France and its neighbours, since the Treaty of Vienna (1815).

Appendix: minor modifications to the frontiers since 1815

Modifications of France's frontiers with Andorra (2001) 
In 2001, a treaty was concluded between France and Andorra mentioning amendment of the border. In it, two parcels of territory were exchanged, each 1.5 ha in area. The operation should permit Andorra to erect, on the land ceded to it, the viaduct which should link the Envalira tunnel to the French Route nationale 22.

Modifications of France's frontiers with Luxembourg (2006) 
In July 2006, a treaty between Luxembourg and France exchanged parcels of 8.096079 hectares, to allow the formation of infrastructure financed by the Government of the Grand Duchy of Luxembourg, on French territory, (in the commune of Russange, Moselle). The work was connected with the industrial site of West Belval.

Modifications of France's frontiers with Switzerland (1945 to 2002) 
Since 1945 very many minor modifications of the frontier have been concluded with Switzerland.:
 19 December 1947 : accord concerning the pounds at Kembs and at Ottmarsheim, of the lateral canal of the Rhine (modification of the frontier to take account of the diversion of the Rhine from the canal bed).
 4 July 1949 : convention relating to the construction and use of the Basel-Mulhouse airport at Blotzheim (construction of the airport of Basel was done partially on land of the commune of Blotzheim; Switzerland reciprocated by secession of territory and Mulhouse (France) has benefited equally from the improved international airport. Furnishing and extending the airport have entailed the signing of a series of accords, some of which involved the exchange of land.
 25 February 1953 : convention on the determination of the frontier in Lake Geneva (codification of the customary line of the frontier on the lake).
 25 February 1953 : convention on various modifications of the frontier (exchange of land with Switzerland in Haut-Rhin, the Territory of Belfort and Doubs in order to conform with changes in the local topography).
 25 February 1953 : convention on various modifications of the frontier along the French route nationale N206.
 3 December 1956 : convention concerning the fixing the frontier between the canton of Basel-City (Switzerland) and the département of Haut-Rhin (France).
 3 December 1959 : convention concerning rectifying the border between the canton of Neuchâtel and the département of Doubs.
 3 December 1959 : convention on the correction of the stream, The Boiron.
 3 December 1959 : convention relative to a modification of the border between the canton of Vaud and the département of Ain (between marker stones 287 and 299).
 3 December 1959 : convention concerning a rectification of the border of the Hermance.
 23 August 1963 : convention concerning a rectifying the border between the Canton of Valais and the département of Haute-Savoie;
 10 July 1973 : convention concerning a rectification of the frontier between the département of Haute-Savoie and the Canton of Geneva;
 4–7 July 1977 : exchange of notes relating to the coming into force of the convention of 25 February 1953 between France and Switzerland on various modifications of the border (RN 206) - The date of coming into force was fixed for 26 November 1979.
 18 September 1996 : convention including rectifying the border between the département of Doubs and the Canton of Vaud;
 18 September 1996 : convention aimed at rectifying the border, following the joining of the motorways between Saint-Julien-en-Genevois, Haute-Savoie, and Bardonnex, canton of Geneva (permitted Switzerland to arrange holdings necessary for the construction of a road interchange).
 18 January 2002 : convention aimed at four border rectifications between the canton of Geneva and the départements of Haute-Savoie (communes of Viry, Valleiry et Veigy-Foncenex) and of Ain (commune de Saint-Genis-Pouilly), dealing with a total area of 578 m², aimed at making the line of the frontier more orderly and rational, and so taking into account developments of the land with the passage of time, both in France and in Switzerland, of which most had already been backed by the adjoining owners.

Notes and references 

Political history of France
Boundary treaties
Borders of France